"Euphoria" is a song recorded, co-written, and produced by the American sibling duo The Perry Twins featuring American singer/actress Harper Starling. The single reached number one on Billboard's Dance Club Songs chart in its June 9, 2018 issue, giving the Rhode Island-born brothers their second number one, and Starling her first.

Track listing
Digital download
Euphoria (Perry Twins Original Mix) 4:27		
Euphoria (Perry Twins Club Mix) 6:18		
Euphoria (Perry Twins Original Extended Mix) 5:50		
Euphoria (Dan Thomas Remix) 6:00		
Euphoria (Dan Thomas Radio Edit) 3:42		
Euphoria (Dan Thomas Instrumental) 6:00		
Euphoria (Dirty Werk Remix) 3:30		
Euphoria (Dirty Werk Extended Remix) 4:29

References

External links
Official video at YouTube

2018 songs
2018 singles
Electronic songs